Shin Dong-woo may refer to:

 Shin Dong-woo (actor), South Korean actor
 CNU (singer) (born Shin Dong-woo), South Korean singer and member of group B1A4